Moneyfarm (MFM Investment Ltd.) is an online investment advisor and one of the largest digital wealth management companies in Europe, regulated by the FCA (UK) and CONSOB (ITA).

History
Moneyfarm was founded in March 2011 by Paolo Galvani, chairman, and Giovanni Daprà, CEO. In March 2018 Moneyfarm launched digital Sipp a self-invested personal pension.

Overview
Moneyfarm creates a profile based on a customer's investment target and risk propensity.

Moneyfarm operates from offices in London, Milan, and Cagliari.

Moneyfarm received £96 million in backing from Allianz Asset Management, Poste Italiane, Cabot Square Capital, and Venture Capital fund, United Ventures.

References

Further reading
 
 
 
"Moneyfarm acquires German digital wealth outfit vaamo". Finextra. November 20, 2018
"Wealth manager Moneyfarm wins Poste Italiane, Allianz backing". Reuters. September 26, 2019.
Moneyfarm reaches £1.6 billion under management. Finextra. August 26, 2021.

External links 
Official website

Investment companies of the United Kingdom
Online financial services companies of the United Kingdom